Pareuchontha albipes is a moth of the family Notodontidae. It is found in Ecuador.

References

Moths described in 1890
Notodontidae of South America